Abrantes is an administrative neighborhood (barrio) of Madrid belonging to the district of Carabanchel. As of 1 February 2020, it as a population of 32,145. The Emperatriz María de Austria Park,  in size, spreads across a large part of the neighborhood.

References 

Wards of Madrid
Carabanchel